The  896th Helicopter Reconnaissance and Liaison Squadron (Serbo-Croatian: 896. helikopterska eskadrila za izviđanje i vezu / 896. хеликоптерска ескадрила за извиђање и везу) was an aviation squadron of Yugoslav Air Force formed in 1981 at Batajnica air base 896th Helicopter Flight (Serbo-Croatian: 896. helikoptersko odeljenje / 896. хеликоптерско одељење).

The helicopter flight was formed by order from August 18, 1981, for with 1st Army of Yugoslav People's Army for reconnaissance and liaison duties equipped with domestic made Soko SA,341 Gazelle helicopters. By order from March 1, 1985, it is designated as 896th Helicopter Reconnaissance and Liaison Squadron. Due to the 1988 reorganization of field armies of Yugoslav People's Army, 896th Squadron has been strengthened for one flight at Rajlovci airport (former 892nd Helicopter Reconnaissance and Liaison Squadron).

The squadron took part in early combat operations in the Croatian war and war in Bosnia and Herzegovina during the 1991 and 1992. It was disbanded in 1992, and its personnel and equipment were transferred to 890th Transport Helicopter Squadron. The flight at Rajlovci airport has joined Republika Srpska Air Force, being merged to its 711st Anti-Armored Helicopter Squadron.

Assignments
Naval Military District (1981–1991)

Previous designations
896th Helicopter Flight (1981–1985)
896th Helicopter Reconnaissance and Liaison Squadron (1985–1992)

Equipment
Soko SA.341 Gazelle Hera (1981–1991)

References

Yugoslav Air Force squadrons
Military units and formations established in 1981
Military units and formations disestablished in 1992